El Maiz is a modern sculpture, by Édgar Negret.

It is located at AMA | Art Museum of the Americas, at the Organization of American States, Constitution Avenue and 18th Street, N.W. Washington, D.C.

See also
 List of public art in Washington, D.C., Ward 2

References

Outdoor sculptures in Washington, D.C.
1996 sculptures
Steel sculptures in Washington, D.C.